Liscarroll GAA is a Gaelic Athletic Association club located in the village of Liscarroll in County Cork, Ireland. The club is exclusively concerned with the game of hurling while their governing club, Churchtown, field teams in hurling and Gaelic football. The club plays in the Avondhu division of Cork GAA.

Honours

 Cork Junior Hurling Championship (1): 1934
 Cork Junior B Hurling Championship: Winners (1) 1987
 North Cork Junior A Hurling Championship (2): 1932, 1934

See also
Liscarroll Churchtown Gaels GAA

Avondhu GAA

References

Gaelic games clubs in County Cork
Hurling clubs in County Cork